Selen Gül Altunkulak (born 2 December 1997) is a footballer who plays as a midfielder for French Division 1 Féminine club Rodez. Born in France, she represents Turkey at international level.

Club career
Altunkulak played in the U19 youth team of FC Vendenheim in the 2011–12 season and of FCF Monteux in 2012–13 season. Between 2013 and 2015, she was a member of FC Vendenheim again. In the 2015–16 season, she transferred to FC Metz-Algrange .

For the 2019–20 Division 1 Féminine season, she signed with Olympique de Marseille, which was recently promoted from the Division 2 Féminine.

International career
She was admitted to the Turkey women's national team, and debuted internationally in the Goldcity Women's Cup 2017 on 1 March 2017, and scored her first international goal. She took part at the 2019 FIFA Women's World Cup qualification – UEFA preliminary round – Group 4 matches. In the second match of the tournament, she scored a hat-trick in the match against Luxembourg on 8 April 2017.

References

External links
 Turkey player profile

1997 births
Living people
Citizens of Turkey through descent
Turkish women's footballers
Women's association football midfielders
Turkey women's international footballers
Footballers from Auvergne-Rhône-Alpes
Sportspeople from Valence, Drôme
French women's footballers
French people of Turkish descent
Division 1 Féminine players
FC Metz (women) players
Olympique de Marseille (women) players